Helen Gregory MacGill (Gregory; after first marriage, Flesher; after second marriage, MacGill; January 7, 1864 – February 27, 1947) was one of Canada's first woman judges - and for many years the country's only woman judge - journalist, and a noted women's rights advocate in Canada, where she fought for female suffrage. Daughter of Emma and Silas Ebenezer Gregory, her maternal grandfather was Upper Canada barrister and judge Miles O'Reilly, noted for his successful defense of the group accused of participating in the 1837 Upper Canada Rebellion.

Biography
Helen Emma Gregory was born in Hamilton, Ontario. She became the first woman to receive a Bachelor of Music from Trinity College, and she also  a M.A. degree in 1889 from this institution (now part of the University of Toronto). She was  the only woman in her class and the first female graduate, and the first woman in the British Empire to receive a degree in music. She then went into newspaper work, working as a journalist for Cosmopolitan.

First married in 1890, her first husband, F.C. "Lee" Flesher, died in 1901 from the consequences of an earlier knife attack from one of the patients at the Mayo Clinic, leaving behind two young boys, Eric (1891) and Freddy (1894). She married the lawyer James Henry "Jim" MacGill, a friend from her college days, in 1902. With MacGill, she gave birth to two daughters, "Young Helen" (Dr.  Helen MacGill Hughes (1903), and Elsie MacGill (1905), a pioneering female aeronautical engineer and aircraft designer.

She died on February 27, 1947, in Chicago- Illinois, at the age of 83

Life as a journalist 
As part of her job as a foreign correspondent for Cosmopolitan magazine, she had as her first assignment the interview leading members of parliament of Japan in 1890. She also made some articles for Toronto Globe and wrote for some other magazines and papers like the Vancouver Daily World and People’s Magazine.

Life as a judge 
As part of her political and social role, Helen was involved in the legal and political realities of British Columbia. As chairman of the Laws Committee of the University Women’s club, she was concerned about the situation of domestic legislation in the province This situation led her to learn on his own about the subject, and then she self-published the book Daughters, wives and mothers in British Columbia as a guidebook with the laws regarding the topic.

Helen Gregory MacGill became the first British Columbia female judge in 1917 and the third in Canada. She served as a juvenile court judge from 1917 to 1929. Then from 1934 to 1945. After 23 years of service, she retired at age of 81.

As part of her legacy, she contributed to the study of the field of juvenile delinquency. Also, she worked for improvements in the social welfare system.

Life as feminist 
Helen was a feminist within the system that rejected radical feminism and believed that the role of a mother was the one that should allow women to be part of the public sphere. During her life, she advocated for women’s rights, like the right to vote, and she also fought for inclusive changes for women and children from the legal reform perspective.

Always active in women's rights, she became a member of the British Columbia Minimum Wage Board, periodically chairing meetings, and referring debates on sector-based minimum wages. She was a co-founder of the Vancouver Business and Professional Women's Club in 1923. In 1930, she was instrumental in creating the Canadian Federation of Business and Professional Women Clubs. While her husband had strong ties to the Laurier Liberals, Helen MacGill was a committed Conservative.

References

Further reading
 MacGill, E. M. G. My mother, the judge: a biography of Judge Helen Gregory MacGill. (1955). Toronto: Ryerson Press; reprinted in 1981 by Toronto: PMA Books, .

1864 births
1947 deaths
Judges in British Columbia
People from Hamilton, Ontario
Trinity College (Canada) alumni
University of Toronto alumni
Canadian women judges
Persons of National Historic Significance (Canada)